is a Shinto shrine in Nishinomiya City, Hyōgo Prefecture, Japan. The town's name, "Nishinomiya", means "shrine of the west", and the town is named for Hirota Shrine.

Location
Hirota Shrine is near the bus stop for Hankyu Bus Co., Ltd. and Hanshin Bus Co., Ltd. "Hirota-Jinja-mae".

from Nishinomiya-kitaguchi Station (Hankyu Kobe Line)
Hankyu Bus Route 12 (for Kotoen)
from JR West Nishinomiya Station (JR Kobe Line)
Hankyu Bus Route 11 (for Kotoen)
from Hanshin Nishinomiya Station (Main Line)
Hanshin Bus Yamate Loop (counterclockwise, via Nishinomiya-Shiyakusho-mae)

History

Hirota Shrine is one of three shrines which, according to Nihon Shoki, a historical epic chronicle, were established by the Empress Jingū in the 3rd century. According to legend, Amaterasu, Goddess of the Sun, and arguably the most important kami in Shinto, spoke to the Empress and declared that she and the other gods of Japan must be enshrined in Hirota, Nagata, Ikuta, and Sumiyoshi. The Empress Consort did as commanded, and then achieved her political ambitions.

The shrine became the object of Imperial patronage during the early Heian period.  In 965, Emperor Murakami ordered that Imperial messengers were sent to report important events to the guardian kami of Japan. These heihaku were initially presented to 16 shrines; and in 991, Emperor Ichijō added three more shrines to Murakami's list — including Hirota.

In the 11th century, under Emperor Shirakawa, Hirota Shrine was designated as "one of the twenty-two honorable shrines in the nation" and given the title "Hirota Grand Shrine". Today it is the only grand shrine in Hyōgo. Others may use the term "taisha" (grand shrine), but they are without the Imperial distinction that sets Hirota Shrine apart.

The shrine is  famous for its kobanomitsuba tsutsuji, azaleas with three small leaves.

Events
Hirota Shinto shrine hosts these events:

January 1: Sai-tan-sai
January 3: Gen-shi-sai
January 1–3: Kai-un-sai
January 18–19: Yaku-yoke-sai
February 11: Ki-gen-sai
February 17: Ki-nen-sai (Taisai)
March 16: Rei-sai (Taisai)
April 16: Haru matsuri (Spring festival)
Late May: Hirota Ohtaue (Rice planting festival)
June 30: Nagoshi no oohara eshiki
July 16: Natsu matsuri (Summer festival)
Late September: Neki-ho-sai
October 16: Aki matsuri (Autumn festival)
November 3: Mei-ji-sai
November 23: Nii-name-sai (Taisai)
December 23: Ten-chou-sai
First day of each month: Tsuki hajime sai, Hatsu hokou-sai
Sixteenth day of each month: Tsuki-name-sai
Every morning: Asa-mi-ke-sai, Yuu-mi-ke-sai

See also
 List of Shinto shrines
 Twenty-Two Shrines
 Modern system of ranked Shinto Shrines

Notes

References
 Breen, John and Mark Teeuwen. (2000).  Shinto in History: Ways of the Kami. Honolulu: University of Hawaii Press. 
 Ponsonby-Fane, Richard. (1959).  The Imperial House of Japan. Kyoto: Ponsonby Memorial Society. OCLC 194887
 ___. (1962).   Studies in Shinto and Shrines. Kyoto: Ponsonby Memorial Society. OCLC 399449
Some of this article's contents are derived from the Hirota Jinja article on the Japanese Wikipedia.

Beppyo shrines
Kanpei-taisha
3rd-century establishments in Japan
Shinto shrines in Hyōgo Prefecture
3rd-century religious buildings and structures